Skymaster Airlines was a cargo airline based in Manaus, Brazil. It operated charter cargo services in Brazil and other countries in the Americas.

History 
The airline was established on 30 November 1995 and started operations in 1997.

On February 19, 2014, Skymaster along with BETA Cargo were fined by CADE (Brazilian antitrust court) a combined 83 million reais (US$35 million), for running a cartel that hampered competition and drove up bid prices of procurements by the country's state-owned postal service Correios.

Fleet 
The Skymaster Airlines fleet included the following aircraft in August 2006, but the maximum was 8 :

 5 Boeing 707-300F
 1 Douglas DC-8-62CF
 2 Douglas DC-8-63CF

Crashes and Incidents 
 On 7 March 2001, a Skymaster Airlines 707-320C, registration PT-MST, landed hard on Runway 09R, São Paulo-Guarulhos International Airport in São Paulo, Brazil. As a result of the landing the undercarriage failed, damaging all four engines and injuring three people. The aircraft was subsequently written off.

See also
List of defunct airlines of Brazil

References

External links

Skymaster Airlines

Defunct airlines of Brazil
Cargo airlines
Airlines established in 1995